Brexpiprazole, sold under the brand name Rexulti among others, is a medication used for the treatment of major depressive disorder and schizophrenia. It is an atypical antipsychotic.

The most common side effects include akathisia (a constant urge to move, which may affect around 6 in 100 people) and weight gain (which may affect around 4 in 100 people).

Brexpiprazole was developed by Otsuka and Lundbeck, and is considered to be a successor to aripiprazole (Abilify). It was approved for medical use in the United States in July 2015. It is available as a generic medication.

Medical uses
In the United States and Canada, brexpiprazole is indicated as an adjunctive therapy to antidepressants for the treatment of major depressive disorder and for the treatment of schizophrenia.

In Australia and the European Union, brexpiprazole is indicated for the treatment of schizophrenia.

Brexpiprazole is approved for the indication of schizophrenia in Canada, United States, Australia, Japan and the European Union. In 2019, it was also approved in Canada as adjunctive treatment in major depressive disorder. In 2020, it was approved in Brazil only as an adjunctive to the treatment of major depressive disorder. In the United States it was given extended approval for schizophrenia in 2022, for the treatment of children from ages 13 to 17.

Side effects
The most common adverse events associated with brexpiprazole (all doses of brexpiprazole cumulatively greater than or equal to 5% vs. placebo) were upper respiratory tract infection (6.9% vs. 4.8%), akathisia (6.6% vs. 3.2%), weight gain (6.3% vs. 0.8%), and nasopharyngitis (5.0% vs. 1.6%). Brexpiprazole can cause impulse control disorders.

Pharmacology

Pharmacodynamics

Brexpiprazole acts as a partial agonist of the serotonin 5-HT1A receptor and the dopamine D2 and D3 receptors. Partial agonists have both blocking properties and stimulating properties at the receptor they bind to. The ratio of blocking activity to stimulating activity determines a portion of its clinical effects. Brexpiprazole has more blocking and less stimulating activity at the dopamine receptors than its predecessor, aripiprazole, which may decrease its risk for agitation and restlessness. Specifically, where aripiprazole has an intrinsic activity or agonist effect at the D2 receptor of 60%+, brexpiprazole has an intrinsic activity at the same receptor of about 45%. For aripiprazole, this means more dopamine receptor activation at lower doses, with blockade being reached at higher doses, while brexpiprazole has the inverse effect because a partial agonist competes with dopamine. Brexpiprazole has a high affinity for the 5-HT1A receptor, acting as a potent antagonist at 5-HT2A receptors, and a potent partial agonist at dopamine D2 receptors with lower intrinsic activity compared to aripiprazole. In vivo characterization of brexpiprazole shows that it may act as a near-full agonist of the 5-HT1A receptor. This may further underlie a lower potential than aripiprazole to cause treatment-emergent, movement-related disorders such as akathisia due to the downstream dopamine release that is triggered by 5-HT1A receptor agonism. It is also an antagonist of the serotonin 5-HT2A, 5-HT2B, and 5-HT7 receptors, which may contribute to antidepressant effect. It also binds to and blocks the α1A-, α1B-, α1D-, and α2C-adrenergic receptors. The drug has negligible affinity for the muscarinic acetylcholine receptors, and hence has no anticholinergic effects. Although brexpiprazole has less affinity for H1 compared to aripiprazole, weight gain can occur.

History

Clinical trials
Brexpiprazole was in clinical trials for adjunctive treatment of MDD, adult ADHD, bipolar disorder and schizophrenia.

Major depression

Phase II
The Phase II multicenter, double-blind, placebo-controlled study randomized 429 adult MDD patients who exhibited an inadequate response to one to three approved antidepressant treatments (ADTs) in the current episode. The study was designed to assess the efficacy and safety of brexpiprazole as an adjunctive treatment to standard antidepressant treatment. The antidepressants included in the study were desvenlafaxine, escitalopram, fluoxetine, paroxetine, sertraline, and venlafaxine.

Phase III
A new Phase III study was in the recruiting stage: "Study of the Safety and Efficacy of Two Fixed Doses of OPC-34712 as Adjunctive Therapy in the Treatment of Adults With Major Depressive Disorder (the Polaris Trial)". Its goal is "to compare the effect of brexpiprazole to the effect of placebo (an inactive substance) as add on treatment to an assigned FDA approved antidepressant treatment (ADT) in patients with major depressive disorder who demonstrate an incomplete response to a prospective trial of the same assigned FDA approved ADT". Estimated enrollment was 1250 volunteers.

ADHD
 Attention Deficit/Hyperactivity Disorder (STEP-A)

Schizophrenia

Phase I
 Trial to Evaluate the Effects of OPC-34712 (brexpiprazole) on QT/QTc in Subjects With Schizophrenia or Schizoaffective Disorder

Phase II
 A Dose-finding Trial of OPC-34712 in Patients With Schizophrenia

Phase III
 Efficacy Study of OPC-34712 in Adults With Acute Schizophrenia (BEACON)
 Study of the Effectiveness of Three Different Doses of OPC-34712 in the Treatment of Adults With Acute Schizophrenia (VECTOR) 
 A Long-term Trial of OPC-34712 in Patients With Schizophrenia

Conferences
 Phase II results were presented at the American Psychiatric Association's 2011 annual meeting in May 2011.
 The drug has been presented at the 2nd Congress of Asian College of Neuropsychopharmacology in September 2011.
 At the US Psychiatric and Mental Health Congress in November 2011 in Vegas, Robert McQuade presented the Phase II Trial results for Schizophrenia

Society and culture

Legal status
In January 2018, it was approved for the treatment of schizophrenia in Japan.

Economics 
In November 2011, Otsuka Pharmaceutical and Lundbeck announced a global alliance. Lundbeck gave Otsuka an upfront payment of $200 million, and the deal includes development, regulatory and sales payments, for a potential total of $1.8 billion. Specifically for OPC-34712, Lundbeck will obtain 50% of net sales in Europe and Canada and 45% of net sales in the US from Otsuka.

Patents
 
 WIPO PCT/JP2006/317704
 Canadian patent: 2620688

Research
Brexpiprazole was under development for the treatment of attention deficit hyperactivity disorder (ADHD) as an adjunct to stimulants, but was discontinued for this indication. It reached phase 2 clinical trials for this use prior to discontinuation.

References

External links 
 
 

7-(4-(4-Phenylpiperazin-1-yl)butoxy)-1H-quinolin-2-ones
5-HT1A antagonists
5-HT2A antagonists
5-HT2B antagonists
5-HT7 antagonists
Alpha-1 blockers
Alpha-2 blockers
Atypical antipsychotics
Benzothiophenes
D2-receptor agonists
D3 receptor agonists
Otsuka Pharmaceutical